Eleutherodactylus principalis is a species of frog in the family Eleutherodactylidae. It is endemic to eastern Cuba and found in the upland regions of Holguín and Guantánamo Provinces. It is an arboreal species that is moderately common within suitable habitat. It is threatened by habitat loss caused by mining and agriculture. It occurs in the Alejandro de Humboldt National Park, but habitat loss is also occurring in the park.

References

principalis
Endemic fauna of Cuba
Amphibians of Cuba
Amphibians described in 1997
Taxa named by Stephen Blair Hedges
Taxonomy articles created by Polbot